Atonal bHLH transcription factor 8 is a protein that in humans is encoded by the ATOH8 gene.

References

Further reading